Anecdotes of Destiny is a collection of stories by Danish author Isak Dinesen (Karen Blixen). It was the last work published during Karen Blixen's lifetime, on October 12, 1958.

Two of the stories from the collection have been adapted into films: "The Immortal Story" as the 1968 film The Immortal Story (directed by Orson Welles), and "Babette's Feast" as the 1987 Danish film Babette's Feast (directed by Gabriel Axel).

The collection was re-published in 1993 by the Vintage Books imprint, combined with Blixen's novella Ehrengard, under the title Anecdotes of Destiny and Ehrengard.

External links
 

1958 short story collections
Works by Karen Blixen